Cumberworth is a small village and civil parish in the East Lindsey district of Lincolnshire, England.

After the Domesday survey Rainer of Brimeaux became Lord of the Manor.

Cumberworth church was dedicated to St Helen and is a Grade II Listed Building. It was declared redundant in 1987 and sold in 1989.

References

Villages in Lincolnshire
Civil parishes in Lincolnshire
East Lindsey District